Alexandru Ciucur (born 1 March 1990) is a Romanian professional footballer who plays as a right winger for Liga III side CS Afumați.

Club career

Internațional Curtea de Argeș
Ciucur was an important member of the team in the 2008–09 season when he helped Internațional Curtea de Argeș earn promotion to the Liga I. In his second season with the team, he did not see too much action.

Pandurii Târgu Jiu and loans
Searching more play time he joined Liga I side Pandurii Târgu Jiu. He did not make a breakthrough playing just one game in six months.

He was loaned for the second half of the 2010–11 season to Liga II side CS Mioveni.

In the summer of 2011 Ciucur joined Politehnica Iași. He finished the 11–12 season in an emphatic manner, scoring very important goals to help Politehnica gain promotion to the Liga I.

In 2013 Pandurii coach, Cristi Pustai, put an end to the loan periods, and offer Ciucur a starting role in the squad. He made his debut in the Europa League after the club finished as Liga I runners-up. On 29 August 2013, Ciucur scored the decisive goal against the Portuguese club SC Braga to make sure Pandurii Targu Jiu progressed to Europa League group stage for the first time in their history.

Honours

CSMS Iași
Liga II: 2011–12

UTA Arad
Liga II: 2019–20

CS Afumați
Liga III: 2021–22

References

External links

1990 births
Living people
People from Dorohoi
Romanian footballers
Association football midfielders
FC Internațional Curtea de Argeș players
CS Pandurii Târgu Jiu players
CS Mioveni players
FC Politehnica Iași (2010) players
ACS Poli Timișoara players
FC Voluntari players
FC UTA Arad players
FC Dunărea Călărași players
CS Afumați players
Liga I players
Liga II players
Liga III players